William Joseph Posey (born December 18, 1947) is an American businessman and politician serving as the U.S. representative for , in Congress since 2009. A member of the Republican Party, he formerly served in the Florida Senate and the Florida House of Representatives.

Early life, education, and business career
Posey was born in Washington, D.C., the son of Beatrice (née Tohl) and Walter J. Posey. His mother's family immigrated from Russia and is of Jewish heritage and his father is a Protestant of primarily English ancestry. Posey moved to Florida in 1956 when his father took a job in engineering with McDonnell Douglas, working on the Delta rocket. In 1969, he graduated from Brevard Community College with an Associate of Arts degree.

Posey got a job with McDonnell Douglas, and did Apollo Space Program work at Kennedy Space Center until he was laid off. From 1974 to 1976, he worked on the Rockledge Planning Commission. In 1976, he was elected a member of the City Council, and from 1986 to 1992, he was a member of the Brevard County Business and Industrial Development Commission. Posey also founded a real estate company during the 1970s, and later became director of the state Association of Realtors. While serving in local politics, he also became a researcher on government accountability and transparency.

Florida legislature
While serving in the state legislature, Posey was a chief sponsor of a bill designed to modernize the Florida election process in response to the 2000 presidential election controversy. He also worked to revise insurance policy so as to aid hurricane victims.

U.S. House of Representatives

Elections

2008

Posey ran to replace retiring U.S. Representative Dave Weldon, who had held the 15th District seat since 1995, when the district first voted Republican.

Posey defeated Democratic nominee Stephen Blythe with 53.1% of the vote to Blythe's 42.0%.

2010

Posey was reelected over former NASA executive and public administrator Shannon Roberts with 64.7% of the vote to Roberts's 35.3%.

2012

Posey was reelected with 58.9% of the vote over Roberts and nonpartisan candidate Richard Gillmor.

2014

Posey was reelected with 65.84% of the vote over Democratic nominee Gabriel Rothblatt.

2016

Posey was reelected with 63.11% of the vote over Democratic nominee Corry Westbrook.

2018

Posey was reelected with 60.50% of the vote over Democratic nominee Sanjay Patel.

2020

Posey was reelected with 61.36% of the vote over Democratic nominee Jim Kennedy.

Committee assignments
 Committee on Financial Services
 Subcommittee on Capital Markets, Insurance, and Government-Sponsored Enterprises
 Subcommittee on Oversight and Investigations
 Committee on Science, Space and Technology 
 United States House Science Subcommittee on Space
 United States House Science Subcommittee on Oversight

Caucus memberships
 Liberty Caucus
 Freedom Caucus
 Congressional Arts Caucus
 Congressional Constitution Caucus
United States Congressional International Conservation Caucus
Climate Solutions Caucus
Republican Study Committee

Political positions

Birther bill 

Shortly after entering Congress, Posey introduced legislation (H.R. 1503) to amend the Federal Election Campaign Act of 1971 to require candidates for the presidency "to include with the [campaign] committee's statement of organization a copy of the candidate's birth certificate" and supporting documentation. Introduced without the Republican leadership's knowledge, the bill, Florida Today wrote, "stems from fringe opponents of President Barack Obama who, during the 2008 election campaign, questioned whether Obama was born in Hawaii". Florida Today added that Posey's office "does not question Obama's citizenship." Posey said his motivation was to "prevent something like this from happening in the future" by requiring "the birth certificate up front and take [the issue] off the table". His initiative was strongly criticized by Florida Democrats, who accused him of trying to "fan the rumors on the extreme fringe of the Republican Party" and "pandering to the right wing". Posey said that there was now "no reason to question" that Obama is a U.S. citizen. The 111th Congress never voted on the bill.

Environment and energy
In 2016, Posey sponsored legislation to reauthorize and reprioritize funding to clean up America's estuaries signed into law by President Obama.

At a May 2018 hearing in the Science, Space and Technology Committee, Posey promoted the claim that climate scientists in the 1970s believed the Earth was cooling; expressed skepticism that humans contribute to climate change, asking whether climate change was occurring because carbon dioxide captured in permafrost was now leaking out; and asked whether warming would be beneficial for habitats and to people. Posey said, "I don't think anybody disputes that the Earth is getting warmer; I think what's not clear is the exact amount of who caused what, and getting to that is, I think, where we're trying to go with this committee."

Foreign policy

In June 2021, Posey was one of 49 House Republicans to vote to repeal the AUMF against Iraq.

Posey was among 19 House Republicans to vote against the final passage of the 2022 National Defense Authorization Act.

In February 2022, Posey co-sponsored the Secure America's Borders First Act, which would prohibit the expenditure or obligation of military and security assistance to Kyiv over the U.S. border with Mexico.

In 2023, Posey was among 47 Republicans to vote in favor of H.Con.Res. 21 which directed President Joe Biden to remove U.S. troops from Syria within 180 days.

Gun law

Posey supports legislation that mandates concealed carry permit reciprocity among states.

From 2015 to 2016, Posey accepted $2,000 in direct campaign contributions from the NRA's Political Victory Fund; from 2008 to 2016 he accepted $13,500 from NRA political action committees.

Posey was one of the original cosponsors of the Repeal of the Implementation of the NICS Improvement Amendments Act of 2007, which repealed Obama-era legislation aimed at preventing the mentally infirm from legally purchasing firearms.

After the 2017 Las Vegas shooting, Posey expressed support for legislation that would ban bump stocks.

Healthcare

Posey supported repealing the Affordable Care Act (Obamacare), calling it a "fiasco" that "was passed under a lot of misrepresentation."

Net neutrality

Posey was the only Republican representative to vote with the Democratic-controlled House for the Save the Internet Act of 2019, which would overturn the Federal Communications Commission's repeal of net neutrality and "restore Obama-era net neutrality protections."

Tax reform

Posey voted for the Tax Cuts and Jobs Act of 2017.

References

External links

 Congressman Bill Posey official U.S. House website
 Campaign website
 
 
 

|-

1947 births
20th-century American politicians
20th-century Methodists
21st-century American politicians
21st-century Methodists
American people of Russian-Jewish descent
American Methodists
American United Methodists
Eastern Florida State College people
Florida city council members
Republican Party Florida state senators
Living people
Methodists from Florida
Republican Party members of the Florida House of Representatives
People from Rockledge, Florida
Republican Party members of the United States House of Representatives from Florida
American people of English descent